Guiñazú is a surname. Notable people with the surname include:

Enrique Ruiz Guiñazú (1884–1967), Argentine politician
Eusebio Guiñazú (born 1982), Argentine rugby union player
Luciano Guiñazú (born 1971), Argentine footballer
Oseas Guiñazú, Argentine politician
Pablo Guiñazú (born 1978), Argentine footballer